Pyŏksŏng County is a county in South Hwanghae province, North Korea.

Administrative divisions
Pyŏksŏng county is divided into 1 ŭp (town) and 21 ri (villages):

Transportation
Pyŏksŏng county is served by the Ongjin Line of the Korean State Railway.

References

Counties of South Hwanghae